The Star class is a series of 8 container ships built for China Shipping Container Lines and currently operated by COSCO SHIPPING Lines. The ships have a maximum theoretical capacity of 14,074 TEU. The ships were built by Samsung Heavy Industries in South Korea.

List of ships

See also 

 Globe-class container ship

References 

Container ship classes
Ships built by Samsung Heavy Industries
Ships of COSCO Shipping